Iota Tauri, Latinized from ι Tauri, is a white-hued star in the zodiac constellation Taurus and an outlying member of the Hyades star cluster. It is visible to the naked eye with an apparent visual magnitude of 4.62, and is located at an estimated distance of about 173 light years based upon parallax measurements. The star is moving away from the Sun with a radial velocity of +38 km/s.

This has been reported as a double star with two components at separation 0.1", both of type A7V and magnitude 5.4. The combined spectrum matches a stellar classification of A7 V, which would normally indicate an A-type main-sequence star that is generating energy through hydrogen fusion at its core. It has an estimated age of 717 million years.

References

A-type main-sequence stars
Hyades (star cluster)
Tauri, Iota
Taurus (constellation)
BD+21 0751
Tauri, 102
032301
023497
1620